Ask Me If I'm Happy is a 2000 Italian comedy drama film directed by Aldo, Giovanni & Giacomo and Massimo Venier.

Plot
In Milan, the three friends Aldo, Giovanni and Giacomo do different jobs, although far below their expectations. So their dream is to set up a play adapted from Cyrano de Bergerac. With them also joins Marina, although the company for listing on the scene proves very complicated.

Cast
Aldo Baglio as Aldo
Giovanni Storti as Giovanni
Giacomo Poretti as Giacomo
Marina Massironi as Marina
Silvana Fallisi as Silvana
Antonio Catania as Antonio
Giuseppe Battiston as Beppe
Augusto Zucchi as Director of the Mall
Paola Cortellesi as Dalia
Cinzia Massironi as Francesca

Reception
It was the highest-grossing Italian film of the year, grossing $28 million.

Accolades

References

External links
 

2000 comedy films
2000 films
Italian comedy films
Films directed by Massimo Venier
Films set in Milan
Films set in Sicily
Films shot in Milan
Films shot in Lazio
2000s Italian-language films